C. Karuppasamy (22 March 1955 – 22 October 2011) was an Indian politician and a former Member of the Legislative Assembly. He was elected to the Tamil Nadu legislative assembly from Sankaranayanarkoil constituency in the 1996, 2001, 2006 elections and 2011 elections as an Anna Dravida Munnetra Kazhagam (ADMK) candidate. His constituency was reserved for candidates from the Scheduled Castes.

Karuppasamy was President of Kallappakulam Panchayat between 1986 and 1991. He was one of only four ADMK candidates to be elected to the Tamil Nadu legislative assembly in 1996, when the Dravida Munnetra Kazhagam routed their opposition. He is staunch Loyalist of AIADMK Supremo Jayalalithaa. He served as Minister for Adi Dravidar and Tribal Welfare between 2002 and 2006. In the later Jayalalithaa-led government, he served briefly Minister for Animal Husbandry (May–June 2011) and also briefly as Minister for Sports and Youth Welfare (June–July 2011). He became a minister without portfolio from July while he underwent treatment for cancer and he retained that position until his death in October 2011.

Personal life 
Karuppasamy was born on 22 March 1955 at Puliyampatti. He was receiving treatment for cancer when he died, aged 56, in a private hospital in Chennai on 22 October 2011. He was survived by his wife, a daughter and son.

References 

All India Anna Dravida Munnetra Kazhagam politicians
2011 deaths
1955 births
State cabinet ministers of Tamil Nadu
Tamil Nadu MLAs 1996–2001
Tamil Nadu MLAs 2001–2006
Tamil Nadu MLAs 2006–2011
Tamil Nadu MLAs 2011–2016